In the cuisine of Sikkim, in northeastern India, rice is a staple food, and fermented foods traditionally constitute a significant portion of the cuisine. Indian cuisine is popular, as Sikkim is the only state of India with an ethnic Indian Gorkha majority. Many restaurants in Sikkim serve various types of Nepalese cuisine, such as the Limbu, Newa and Thakali cuisines. Tibetan cuisine has also influenced Sikkimese cuisine. The combination of various cuisines has resulted in one specific cuisine.

Agriculture 

The geography and modes of food production within Sikkim inform the food culture within the state. The economy of Sikkim is largely agrarian. Due to the state's mountainous terrain, much of the land is unsuitable for farming, so terrace farming, particularly of rice, is common. In addition to rice, other cereal crops cultivated in Sikkim include wheat, maize, barley, and millet. Potatoes, ginger, oranges, tea, and cardamom are also cultivated. Sikkim produces the most cardamom  of any Indian state, about 4200 tons annually. Vegetables commonly grown include tomatoes, broccoli, and iskus.

Although dairy and, to a lesser extent, meat and egg products are common elements of the Sikkimese diet, livestock primarily plays a subsidiary role in Sikkim's agricultural sector. Cattle, sheep, goats, pigs and yaks are raised. 11.7% of people in the rural areas of Sikkim are vegetarian.

In 2016, Sikkim became India's first "organic state" after fully converting its agricultural land to sustainable farming practices.

Fermented foods and common dishes 

Fermented foods are an integral part of Sikkimese cuisine, comprising 12.6% of total food consumption in the state. Polling indicates that 67.7% of Sikkimese people prepare fermented foods at home rather than purchasing them. This suggests that most fermentation is done at the household level with the notable exceptions of chhurpi and marchaa (a starter culture for fermentation), which are purchased in markets.

Various fermented alcoholic beverages are produced by the introduction of marchaa to cereal grain and subsequent saccharification and fermentation in an airtight vessel. Millet, rice, and maize are commonly used. The grain is washed, cooked, combined with marchaa, then saccharified in an earthware pot for about 1–2 days, then fermented for 2–8 days.
Examples of traditional fermented foods are kinema, gundruk, sinki, maseura, and khalpi. Traditional fermented beverages include chyang, tongba, raksi, and kodo ko jaanr.

Dishes  
Sikkimese meals typically follow a bhat-dal-tharkari-achar (Rice-Pulses-Curry-Pickle) pattern.

References

External links

Sikkimese cuisine
Recipes

Indian cuisine by state or union territory
Northeast Indian cuisine
Nepalese cuisine
Tibetan cuisine